Edward Lee Victor Howard (27 October 1951 – 12 July 2002) was a CIA case officer who defected to the Soviet Union.

Pre-CIA career
Howard served as a Peace Corps volunteer in Bucaramanga, Colombia. There he met Mary Cedarleaf in 1973, and they were married three years later in St. Paul, Minnesota. In 1976, Howard earned a master's degree in business administration from the American University in Washington, D.C., and joined USAID. In February 1977, the Howards left for two years to live in Lima, Peru, where he worked on loan projects. There is no evidence to suggest that Howard was anything but a USAID loan officer. After Peru, the Howards returned to the United States, and he went to work in Chicago for a company doing environmental work. On March 19, 1983, the Howards had a son named Lee Howard.

CIA career
Howard was hired by the CIA in 1980 and was later joined by his wife, Mary, where they were both trained in intelligence and counter-intelligence methods. Shortly after the end of their training and before going on their first assignment, a routine polygraph test indicated that he had lied about past drug use, and he was fired by the CIA in 1983 shortly before he was to report to the CIA's station at the American embassy in Moscow.

Disgruntled over the perceived unfairness of having been dismissed over accusations of drug use, petty theft and deception, he began to abuse alcohol. He then began making mysterious phone calls to some former colleagues, both in Washington and in Moscow. In February 1984 after a drunken brawl he was arrested and charged with assault with a deadly weapon. The charges were later reduced to aggravated assault.

At some point Howard apparently began providing classified information to the KGB, possibly contacting KGB officers in Austria in 1984 during a visit there. His information has been blamed for exposing Adolf Tolkachev, who was then executed by the KGB.

In 1985, the CIA was severely shaken by several security leaks that led to exposure of officers and assets. On August 1, 1985, after twenty-five years of service in the KGB, Vitaly Yurchenko walked into the US Embassy in Rome and defected to the United States. In the following interrogations by the CIA, he accused Howard and another officer, Ronald Pelton, of working for the KGB. In November of that year, Yurchenko himself re-defected back to the Soviet Union. It has been suggested that Yurchenko was acting as a re-doubled agent, seeking to fool the CIA with wrong leads to protect one of the Soviet Union's most important CIA double-agents, Aldrich Ames.

Surveillance and escape to Helsinki
The FBI began watching the Howards in Santa Fe, New Mexico. A search warrant was subsequently secured to tap the Howards’ phone. On September 20, 1985, Howard walked up to a member of a surveillance team and indicated that he was ready to talk but wanted first to get a lawyer; a meeting was scheduled for the following week.

The following night, however, Howard disappeared.  As he and his wife Mary drove back from a dinner away from their home, Howard leapt from the car as Mary slowed to round a corner. He left a dummy made from stuffed clothes and an old wig stand in his seat to fool the pursuing agents, and fled to Albuquerque, where he took a plane to New York City. Once at home, Mary called a number she knew would reach an answering machine, and played a pre-recorded message from Edward to fool the wiretap and buy her husband more time. From New York, Howard flew to Helsinki, and from there, he walked into the Soviet embassy.

Howard maintained his innocence until his death. He only fled, he said, because he could see the agency had chosen him to fill Yurchenko's profile and wanted a scapegoat. Howard insisted he refused to divulge anything of real importance in exchange for his Soviet protection.

In 1995 Howard's memoirs, called Safe House, were published by National Press Books in which Howard indicated that he was prepared for a plea bargain with the U.S.

Death
Howard died on July 12, 2002, at his Russian dacha, reportedly from a broken neck after a fall in his home.

See also 
 Robert Hanssen
 Aldrich Ames
 Harold James Nicholson
 Earl Edwin Pitts

References

External links
 Paranoia Magazine interview
 Peace Corps biography of Edward Lee Howard

1951 births
2002 deaths
American intelligence personnel who defected to the Soviet Union
Peace Corps volunteers
People from Santa Fe, New Mexico
People of the Central Intelligence Agency
Double agents
Fugitives wanted under the Espionage Act of 1917
People granted political asylum in the Soviet Union
20th-century American memoirists